Cars is a studio album by the indie rock band Now, Now (Now, Now Every Children). It was released February 27, 2009 on Tapete Records.

Track listing

References

2008 albums
Now, Now albums